Cherry Valley Village Historic District is a national historic district in Cherry Valley in Otsego County, New York.  It was listed on the National Register of Historic Places in 1988. It encompasses 226 contributing buildings, one contributing site, three contributing structures, and two contributing objects.  Its boundaries were increased in 1995, by an area called the Lindesay Patent Rural Historic District. It encompasses 331 contributing buildings.

References

Historic districts on the National Register of Historic Places in New York (state)
Georgian architecture in New York (state)
Federal architecture in New York (state)
Italianate architecture in New York (state)
National Register of Historic Places in Otsego County, New York